Phere: More Than a Wedding is a 2005 Bollywood black comedy film directed by Ishaan Trivedi and produced by  Nimit Modawal. It stars Juhi Chawla and Irrfan Khan in the lead roles. The film was released in India on 29 July 2005, to mixed response.

Plot
After having tasted great success with soaps based on traditional families, a national TV network is getting into the next phase of programming - that is - "Reality TV" so they decide to go for the evergreen subject of marriages in the Indian family. Channel asks their blue-eyed guy to produce the show. Asmi Ganatra (Juhi Chawla), the first time director, and her team finds out that at present the only family in Mumbai that meets the programming brief is Joshi's.

The Joshis are stunned when Asmi visits them with a request to cover the marriage for the TV network. Though the bride's father is willing to go along with the idea, the family's Mafia, consisting of the old guard plays the card of family's pride, and they Veto the proposal. In the meanwhile, Asmi has discovered that Manoj Joshi (Irrfan), the bride's youngest uncle, has fallen for her.

Knowing very well that her career would be blocked if she were unable to pull off the deal with the bride's family, she lures him to an arrangement where a multi camera set-up is secretly installed in the huge house.

Manoj realizes to his horror that he has opened a Pandora's box. Unaware of the hidden cameras, his family behaves true to themselves and slowly skeletons start tumbling out of the cupboard. The privacy of Joshi's family gets invaded by Candid cameras and incidents which should remain buried come out in the open and gives the Channel all sorts of maal masala (juicy tid-bits) to increase their TRP Ratings.

Cast 

 Juhi Chawla as Asmi Ganatra
 Irrfan Khan as Manoj
 Manoj Pahwa as Inspector Rohit Kande
 Nina Kulkarni as  Rati Pant 
 Anang Desai as Suresh Joshi
 Shri Vallabh Vyas as Mahesh 'Taoji' Joshi
 Manini De as Raveena Joshi  
 Chahat Khanna as Piya S. Joshi
 Manish Chaudhary as Nimit Joshi
 Ninad Kamat as
 Shauni Khanna
 Rushad Rana
 Ashok Banthia

Reception
Hindustan Times praised the film, calling it light-hearted and rib-tickling. They noted it as the first time that actors Juhi Chawla and Irrfan Khan had worked together in a film, and as being both Irrfan's entry into and Juhi's return to the comedy genre. They advised that the chemistry between the two actors was to be watched and appreciated as their "conflict and resolution form an integral part of the film."

Soundtrack

See also
 Saat phere
 Saptapadi

Notes

References

External links 
 

2000s Hindi-language films
2005 films
Films scored by Shantanu Moitra
Films scored by Kalyanji Anandji
Hindi-language comedy films
Indian comedy films
2005 comedy films
Films about Indian weddings